The Savoia-Marchetti S.66 was a 1930s Italian twin-hull flying boat designed and built by Savoia-Marchetti as an enlarged development of the S.55.

Development

The S.66 was developed as an enlarged version of the S.55 with the aim of replacing the S.55P. The S.66 was a twin-hull cantilever monoplane flying boat with metal hull and wings and wooden twin-booms and tail unit. The two crew had enclosed cockpit mounted in the wing centre section between the two hulls, each hull contained seven seats, two sleeping couches and a lavatory. The prototype first flew in 1931 powered by three Fiat A.22 R. engines strut-mounted above the wing. The company built 23 production aircraft with three 559 kW (750 hp) Fiat A.24R engines and the sleeping couches were replaced by two to four more seats in each hull.

Operators
Pre-World War II

Ala Littoria
Società Aerea Mediterranea

World War II

Regia Aeronautica operated S.66s for search and rescue

Specifications (S.66)

See also
List of flying boats and floatplanes

Notes

References

S.66
Three-engined pusher aircraft
Flying boats
Twin-fuselage aircraft
1930s Italian airliners
High-wing aircraft
Aircraft first flown in 1931